The Freedom to Create Prize was established in 2008 to foster prosperity in the developing world by investing in the creative foundations of society. The Freedom to Create Prize was awarded from 2008 to 2011 to support and recognise artists who strive for social change in places where there is no "freedom to create".

Freedom to Create Prize 
The Freedom to Create Prize celebrates the power of art to promote social justice and inspire the human spirit. The Prize is open to artists in all creative fields. Artwork is assessed on its ability to accomplish one or all of the following: promote social justice, build societal foundations, and inspire the human spirit.

Each year, US$125,000 in prize money is awarded across three categories: Main, Youth and Imprisoned Artist.

2011 Freedom to Create Prize 
Winners were announced in an award ceremony and concert at the Kirstenbosch National Botanical Garden in Cape Town, South Africa on 19 November 2011. Myanmar's pro-democracy leader and Nobel Peace Prize Laureate Aung San Suu Kyi recorded a special message congratulating Imprisoned Artist Prize winner Win Maw.

Judging Panel 

Judges for the 2011 Freedom to Create Prize included: 2010 Freedom to Create Prize winner and Sudanese theatre producer Ali Mahdi Nouri; Thai filmmaker Apichatpong Weerasethakul; South African writer Achmat Dangor; Croatian born painter Ana Tzarev; Egyptian human rights activist Dalia Ziada; American film actress Daryl Hannah; celebrated street artist D*Face; Pakistani poet, journalist and social activist Fatima Bhutto; philosopher, cultural theorist, and novelist Kwame Anthony Appiah; author Salman Rushdie; Professor Lourdes Arizpe; dancer and actor Mikhail Baryshnikov; award-winning filmmaker and producer Mira Nair; writer and curator Sarah Lewis; and authority on the development of creativity, innovation and human resources, Sir Ken Robinson.

Main Prize Category

Imprisoned Artist Prize

2010 Freedom to Create Prize 
Over 1,700 artists from 127 countries participated in the 2010 Freedom to Create Prize. Winners were announced in a ceremony at the Salah El Din Citadel in Cairo, Egypt on 26 November 2010.

Judging Panel 
This year's judging panel comprised 13 individuals from a broad range of expertise. They are: Egypt's former first lady and human rights campaigner Mrs Jehan Sedat; Pakistani poet, journalist and social activist, Fatima Bhutto; prominent theorist on Critical Race theory and professor at UCLA School of Law and Columbia Law School Professor Kimberlé Crenshaw; celebrated street artist D*Face; non-executive director at the UK Financial Services Authority, Professor Dame Sandra Dawson OBE; 2009 Freedom to Create Prize winner and acclaimed Iranian filmmaker Mohsen Makhmalbaf; award-winning filmmaker and producer Mira Nair; journalist and author Mariane Pearl; Professor of Contemporary Islamic Studies at the Oxford University, Professor Tariq Ramadan; leading human rights lawyer Geoffrey Robertson QC; authority on the development of creativity, innovation and human resources, Sir Ken Robinson; former diplomat and lecturer on cultural diplomacy, Professor Cynthia P. Schneider; and Croatian born artist Ana Tzarev.

Reaction 
2010 Freedom to Create Prize panelist and former First Lady of Egypt, Jehan Sadat, said:
"The artists who have been selected as finalists in this year's Freedom to Create competition know full well the price they are paying to express their ideas, hopes, and dreams for their people and their nations. They have endured harsh criticisms, and in some cases, have placed themselves in grave danger.  As a result, they have done more than expose the ills plaguing their societies.  They have provided solutions and alternatives, and by so doing, they are trying to change the world.  Each exemplifies the power of art, music, and the written word."

Main Prize Category

Youth Prize Category

Imprisoned Artist Prize Category

2009 Freedom to Create Prize 
The shortlisted artists for the 2009 Freedom to Create Prize were announced on 26 October 2009. In total, there were 1,015 artists from more than 100 countries.

Judging Panel 
The 2009 Freedom to Create Prize was judged by a panel of high-profile artists, opinion formers, and human rights experts. They were: leading international human rights lawyer and jurist on the UN's Internal Justice Council Geoffrey Robertson QC; composer and founder of West-Eastern Divan Orchestra Daniel Barenboim; co-founder, along with Kofi Annan, of global diplomatic group, The Global Elders, and founder of Indian women and micro-finance movements Dr Ela Bhatt; BBC arts correspondent Razia Iqbal; Time Out founder and chair of Human Rights Watch Tony Elliott; award-winning Anglo-Indian artist Sacha Jafri; New York-based arts lawyer Peter Stern; artist Ana Tzarev; and Zimbabwean playwright Cont Mhlanga, winner of the inaugural Freedom to Create Prize in 2008.

Main Prize Category

Youth Prize Category

Imprisoned Artist Prize Category

2008 Freedom to Create Prize

Results and judging panel 

The inaugural Freedom to Create Prize attracted more than 900 entries from 86 countries. The 2008 award was judged by a panel of artists, commentators and human rights experts including Andrew Dickson, Htein Lin, Carlos Reyes-Manzo and Ana Tzarev.

Reaction 

Presenting an award at the 2008 ceremony in London, renowned playwright Sir Tom Stoppard said, "My participation in the Freedom to Create Prize was my first contact with this truly admirable enterprise. It is important that abuses of human rights are attacked from all sides of every free society."

Freedom to Create Prize Exhibition 

The Freedom to Create Prize Exhibition was a yearly travelling exhibition of notable entries from that year's Freedom to Create Prize. The 2009, 2010, and 2011 Prize Exhibitions were held in various cities around the world, including London, New York City, Harare, Kabul, Cairo, Mumbai, Sarajevo, and Xiamen.

Freedom to Create Forum 

In 2010, Freedom to Create launched a new initiative, the Freedom to Create Forum. The forum was a series of panel discussions which aimed to debate the challenges and opportunities for women in building creative and prosperous lives, families and communities.

The inaugural forum was held on 24 November 2010, at the American University in Cairo. The panel featured guest of honour and 2010 Prize judge Jehan Sedat, moderator and international broadcaster Femi Oke and was accompanied by Mariane Pearl, Dalia Ziada, Professor Kimberlé Crenshaw and Dianne Laurance. It focused on the misuse of traditional, cultural, and religious dogmas that hinder opportunities for women.

There were two Freedom to Create Forums held in 2011. The first was held in New York, featuring a discussion on female entrepreneurship and empowerment in developing countries. The panel featured Mary Ellen Iskenderian, Francine LeFrak, Lauren Bush, and moderator Femi Oke. The second Forum was held in Cape Town, featuring women who have challenged structures keeping women vulnerable in their communities. The panel included keynote speaker Graça Machel, panelists Unity Dow, Chouchou Namegabe, and Molly Melching, and moderator Gcina Mhlophe.

Sources

Freedom to Create Prize 2009 Winner's Announcement:

Iranian director, opposition campaigner wins award 'Reuters'

Iran should face smarter sanctions, says Mohsen Makhmalbaf 'Guardian'

Iranian filmmaker collects prize  'Channel4'

Iranian filmmaker collects prize 'Telegraph'

Iranian Director, Opposition Campaigner Wins Award 'New York Times'

Mohsen Makhmalbaf 'Al Jazeera'

Makhmalbaf: back democracy in Iran 'Guardian'

Freedom to Create Prize 2009 Shortlisted Artists' Announcement:

Iran director, Saharan singer up for prize 'Saudi Gazette'

Freedom to Create Prize Announces Finalists 'Newstin'

Freedom to Create Prize Announces Finalists 'USA Today'

Iranian Director amongst the nominees for Freedom to Create Prize  'Yahoo Entretenimiento'

Freedom to Create Prize Announces Finalists 'Payvand.com'

Iranian Director amongst the nominees for Freedom to Create Prize 'International Business Times'

Iranian Director, Journalist Up for Social Justice Prize 'Washington TV'

Iran director, Saharan singer up for prize 'Yahoo - India News'

Iran director, Saharan singer up for prize 'Insing.com'

Selected coverage from 2009 Freedom to Create Launch:

Cont Mhlanga talks about writing against the backdrop of Robert Mugabe's regime 'Guardian'

Letter from Africa, 'When you tell a joke in the street, that is political' 'BBC'

Selected coverage from Freedom to Create Prize 2008:

Taking on Mugabe 'BBC'

Arts & Free Expression in Zimbabwe 'Guardian'

Critic of Mugabe Wins Arts Prize 'New York Times'

References

External links
Freedom to Create website

Arts awards